John W. McDonnell (September 16, 1854 – November 11, 1939) was an American politician in the state of Washington. He served in the Washington House of Representatives from 1895 to 1897.

References

Republican Party members of the Washington House of Representatives
1854 births
1939 deaths
Politicians from Worcester, Massachusetts